Googly Mohalla is a Pakistani finite Cricket World Cup 2015 special comedy drama series. It starred Jahanzeb Khan and Aiman Khan as main leads, while Hina Dilpazeer in supporting role. It was aired on Pakistan Television Network during 2015.

Plot 
The drama opens when all the boys of compound are all set to play cricket. But one of the members of the team, Asif Lamboo doesn't show serious behaviour towards the game. Due to his non-serious behaviour the captain of the team, Farhat Goli feels the need of another guy to replace Asif. Meanwhile a new Pathan family consisting of a son (Zahid Afridi), mother (Shahnaz), father (Jahanzeb), grandmother (Bibi Gul) and grandfather (Baba Saeen) shifts to the respective compound. Zahid Afridi proves to be a very good all-rounder and hence after a series of events, he replaces Asif Lamboo in the team. Asif is a volcano after being kicked from the team. He joins another team Ghosia from the same colony. Ghosia is a competent of compound's team.

Cast
 Jahanzeb Khan as Zahid Afridi
 Aiman Khan as Nazish/Sweety
 Muneeb Butt as Farhat (Goli)
 Shazma Haleem as Shehnaz (Zahid's mother)
 Saeed Muntazim Shah as Jahanzeb khan (Zahid's father)
 Hina Dilpazeer as Naheed (Sweety's mother)/Champa Rani
 Nawshaba khan as Bibigul
 Salma Hassan as Fouzia (Asif lambo's mother)
 Junaid Akhtar as Asif Lambo
 Haddy Firdousi as Billu Bill
 Huma Nawab  as Bhaya coach
 Shehnaz Pervaiz as Aapa Jan
 Waqar Hussain as Bhaya's brother
 Hira Sheikh as Shamsa 
 Zeba Shehnaz as Pari Gul
 Sara Razi as Palwasha
 Shahid Naqvi as Saeed (Asif lambo's father)
 Raza Zaidi as Ghafoor Mota (Sweety's Brother)

References

2015 Pakistani television series debuts